The Premios 40 Principales for Best International New Artist is an honor presented annually at Los Premios 40 Principales, a ceremony that recognizes excellence in music organised by Spain's top music radio Los 40 Principales. The award was first presented in the inaugural award show in 2006, but would not be seen again until the 2012 edition.

References

Los Premios 40 Principales
Awards established in 2006
Spanish music awards